In electrical power transmission, a transposition tower is a transmission tower that changes the relative physical positions of the conductors of a transmission line in a Polyphase system. A transposition tower allows these sections to be connected together, while maintaining adequate clearance for the conductors. This is important since it distributes electrical impedances between phases of a circuit over time, reducing the problem of one conductor carrying more current than others.

Double-circuit lines are usually set up with conductors of the same phase placed opposite each other.
This reduces the reactance due to mutual inductance; the reactance of both circuits together is less than half that of one circuit. For example, a section of a line may be (top-to-bottom) phases A-B-C on the left, also phases C'-B'-A' on the right. The next section may be B-C-A on the left, also A'-C'-B' on the right. Therefore, the rotation on each side of the tower will be opposite.

See also

 Transposition (telecommunications)
 Suspension tower
 Dead-end tower

References

External links

Overhead power lines
Electric power transmission